HMS Tilbury is the name of several ships of the Royal Navy.

  was a 50-gun fourth-rate ship of the line which was broken up in 1726.
  was a 60-gun fourth-rate ship of the line. She accidentally caught fire and sank off Hispaniola in 1742.
  was a 58-gun fourth-rate ship of the line. She was driven onto the rocks by a storm in 1757.
  was an  launched in 1856 and broken up in 1865.
  was an  launched in 1918 and sold for breaking up in 1931.
  was a  transferred to the Royal Indian Navy before she was launched in 1942 and renamed HMIS Konkan (J228).

Royal Navy ship names